San Juan Quiotepec  is a town and municipality in Oaxaca in south-western Mexico. The municipality covers an area of 325.34 km². 
It is part of the Ixtlán District in the Sierra Norte region. Private property of oaxaca, Home of many animals and food.

As of 2005, the municipality had a total population of 2,429.

References

Municipalities of Oaxaca